Bebop and Rocksteady are a fictional duo of a mutant warthog and mutant rhinoceros that have made appearances as characters in various media releases of the Teenage Mutant Ninja Turtles franchise. The two characters are henchmen who follow the orders of the villain and the main antagonist of the franchise Shredder, the leader of the Foot Clan. Their names are both derived from genres of music: bebop is a style of jazz, while rocksteady is a Jamaican music style, a precursor to reggae.

Character creation
The characters were designed by Peter Laird while negotiating the Turtles action figure deal with Playmates Toys, because they wanted more characters to release. They were added to the 1987 Teenage Mutant Ninja Turtles animated television series and given names, personalities, and an origin story by writer David Wise, based on instructions by Fred Wolf to "put more mutants in the series".

Transition to comic books and publication history

Archie Comics
Rocksteady and Bebop were featured in the comic book series Teenage Mutant Ninja Turtles Adventures, with similar origins and dimwittedness. As told in the cartoon, they were street gang members mutated by the Shredder to help him defeat the turtles.

As the series progressed, the animal side of Bebop and Rocksteady surfaced as they dreamed and longed for the 'old days' when they were just animals in the wild (Rocksteady in particular had dreams where he was a real rhino in the wild). When the Shredder and his bunch were defeated by the TMNT in the 'Final Conflict' (issue #13), Rocksteady and Bebop were banished to an Eden World, a huge paradise planet in Dimension X, full of wilderness and natural wildlife, without any humans or similar to disrupt their peace, and they enjoyed it.

In issues #23-#25, Krang, who was banished to the toxic waste dump planet Morbus for exiled criminals, befriended two other criminals, Slash and Bellybomb. The group stole a spaceship and headed to Earth and happened to stop along the way at the same Eden World that Bebop and Rocksteady inhabited. Being bored of Paradise, Rocksteady and Bebop joined them on the trip back to Earth. However, rather than battle the turtles, the pair left Krang and the villains to fight the turtles and wandered the streets of New York City on their own. They robbed a clothing store to get clothes similar to their original attire, and a gun store for some guns. They then went to the zoo and blasted all the cages, setting all the animals free. Just as the turtles managed to defeat Krang (who had taken over Shredder's body), Rocksteady and Bebop arrived with guns and all the zoo animals, intending to take them back to the same Eden World. The turtles surrendered and let Bebop and Rocksteady escape in the spaceship with the animals. Leonardo asked them to take the defeated Krang and Bellybomb with them back to Morbus in Dimension X (Slash had already left the scene and was wandering the city). Bebop and Rocksteady did as asked and bid the Ninja Turtles farewell. The final panel of #25 shows the two mutants removing their clothes and going back to their simple life in the wilds of the Eden World.

Bebop and Rocksteady maintained the abilities they demonstrated in the cartoon including their superhuman strength. After the initial mini-series, the duo seemed to become even less intelligent than their cartoon versions.

In Archie Comics's Sonic Universe #29 (June 2011), Bebop and Rocksteady are seen in the Zone Jail, ready to bully Sonic the Hedgehog's evil counterpart Scourge, who was reading "How Not to Be Seen".

IDW Comics
Bebop and Rocksteady are shown in their human forms in Teenage Mutant Ninja Turtles: Micro Series #1 (December 2011). They work alongside an Arctic fox mutant named Alopex and appear mutated in Teenage Mutant Ninja Turtles #25 (August 2013). Their back story is told in Teenage Mutant Ninja Turtles: Villains Micro-Series #7 (October 2013).

In this version, they fully understood the implications of their mutation, having successfully fought and defeated all other candidates for the right after being defeated by the Turtles as humans. It is revealed in the micro-series that having been kicked out of gangs in the past owing to their incompetence, they are fanatically determined to remain in the Foot Clan.

They were ordered by Shredder to kill Donatello, which they carried out. Rocksteady smashed Donatello's shell with a sledgehammer, leaving the Turtle in a pool of blood. However, Donatello clung to life long enough for his consciousness to be temporarily transferred into the robot Metalhead while his turtle body was being restored. After Shredder's death in issue #50, Bebop and Rocksteady desert the Foot and, after inadvertently coming into contact with Savanti Romero and his stolen Time Scepter, wreak so much havoc across the multiverse that all reality is pushed to the brink of obliteration; the Turtles and their time mistress friend Renet just barely manage to avert that catastrophe.

In other media

Television

Teenage Mutant Ninja Turtles (1987–1996)

Bebop (voiced by Barry Gordon in most appearances, Greg Berg in some 1989 episodes) and Rocksteady (voiced by Cam Clarke) were introduced in the series as members of a human street gang in New York City that was employed by Shredder. Rocksteady, the gang's leader, was a short and stocky blond Caucasian man (who sported army camouflage pants that would be replaced with simple beige cargo pants later while also occasionally sporting a strong army helmet on his head in his mutated form). Bebop, the second-in-command, was a taller African American man with a purple mohawk. With the other members of their gang, they were sent out to stop a Channel 6 reporter named April O'Neil from doing a report about crime in the city. April ran down into the sewers while being chased by the street gang and met the Teenage Mutant Ninja Turtles, who then defeated the gang in a fight.

After this humiliating setback, The Shredder developed a plan to defeat the Turtles by mutating members of the street gang that Rocksteady and Bebop are a part of so that they would have abilities greater than the Turtles'. Rocksteady and Bebop both volunteered to undergo the procedure first (though neither was particularly aware of what it would entail) with the promise that it would allow them to exact revenge on the Turtles. As the result of being brought into contact with a common warthog and a black rhinoceros that Shredder had abducted from the zoo, Bebop mutated into a humanoid mutant warthog while Rocksteady mutated into a humanoid mutant black rhinoceros.

Although the transformation did make them larger and stronger, they remained bungling, incompetent simpletons, and were completely inept at stopping the Turtles or carrying out Shredder's plans. Throughout most of the series, they tried to attack the Turtles with brute force, without applying knowledge and strategy. In the episode "The Missing Map," when the two were accidentally caught in Krang's "brain extraction" machine, the results concluded there was "no data to extract," implying that the two possessed little or no knowledge. Most of the time, the Turtles consider them to be formidable in combat (despite their stupidity) due to their great strength and endurance, and as such, often have to resort to using their surroundings to outwit them rather than fighting them in a straightforward manner. But their attempts at the turtles seem to regularly fail due to their incompetence and goofing behavior, which all leads to them being abused both physically and verbally by Shredder and Krang, and the former even fired them in one episode. Rare examples of them achieving success would be capturing Michelangelo in "Cowabunga Shredhead" when he forgets his weapons and using a ray on all four turtles which fills them with fear in the episode "Bebop and Rocksteady Conquer the Universe."

In one episode of the series, Bebop was shown to have kept a pet turtle, which got mutated into the evil turtle Slash.

In Planet of the Turtleoids, Part 1, Bebop and Rocksteady were responsible for causing a red bull and a mole to be exposed to a mutagen-showering machine at the zoo, transforming them into Groundchuck and Dirtbag, by accidentally setting them free at the same time when Shredder and Krang wanted to mutate a lion and a gorilla (which were freed by the Turtleoid Kerma) to be their latest henchmen.

In season eight, Bebop and Rocksteady seemed to have some form of intelligence and talked and joked around less. Rocksteady and Bebop's last appearance is in the season 8 finale Turtle Trek. In that episode, the Turtles destroy the Technodrome's engines, trapping it and its inhabitants in Dimension X for good. While their bosses Krang and Shredder returned in the 10th and final season, Bebop and Rocksteady did not. Their ultimate fate was not explained, although it is assumed that they are still somewhere in Dimension X.

Teenage Mutant Ninja Turtles (2003–2009)
In the 2003 series episode "Fallen Angel", two characters are seen that are dressed like Bebop and Rocksteady and resemble their pre-mutated appearances. In the episode "Samurai Tourist", the character Gen, also an anthropomorphic rhinoceros, put on human clothing that makes him look almost identical to Rocksteady. Also in that episode, Gen is chased by Kojima, an assassin who happens to be a humanoid warthog.

In the Fast Forward episode "Future Shellshock", Michelangelo falls out of a flying truck and onto another vehicle, the driver of which greatly resembles Bebop, only with smaller, more modern sunglasses.

Teenage Mutant Ninja Turtles (2012–2017)

Bebop and Rocksteady appear in the 2012 incarnation, voiced by J. B. Smoove and Fred Tatasciore, respectively.

Rocksteady was first introduced in the series as Ivan Steranko, a Russian arms dealer, and artifact collector with a gold tooth, a diamond right eye, and armed with a pair of brass knuckles (which have a picture of the Soviet hammer and sickle on each), who is an old friend and business partner of the Shredders. Steranko is known to have Excalibur, the Spear of Destiny, Alexander the Great's armor, tanks, a polar bear hunting trophy, and a taxidermy rhinoceros in his collection and the ability to tell the difference between a fake artifact and a real one. He first appeared in "Enemy of My Enemy," where he met with Shredder for a weapons deal. Shredder didn't seem to trust him very well and had the cargo searched just in case Steranko was pulling any tricks. During the Turtles' fight with Shredder, Steranko got knocked out by the weapon that was being sold to the Foot Clan. In "A Chinatown Ghost Story," it was mentioned that Steranko would pay the Purple Dragons through the roof for the Mystic Dagger.

Bebop was later on introduced as Anton Zeck, an African American professional thief in a high-tech Tron-based suit with an energy Mohawk, his dance is almost similar to Michael Jackson's moves, and armed with high-tech gadgets who gave Steranko his diamond right eye in an earlier encounter. He first appeared in "The Legend of the Kuro Kabuto," where he was sent by Steranko to steal Shredder's helmet, the titular Kuro Kabuto. Following his theft, where he left his calling card on a glued-down Rahzar, Zeck ran into the Turtles, who stole the kabuto from him. The Turtles, Rahzar, Fishface, Tiger Claw, and Baxter Stockman fought Zeck over the helmet, but he managed to evade them. When Zeck met up with Steranko in his helicopter, they both discovered that Leonardo swapped the helmet out with dirty diapers at the last minute, to Steranko's rage.

In "Serpent Hunt" and "The Pig and the Rhino", three months after the Kraang conquered New York, a desperate Steranko and Zeck resolve to capture the mutated Karai in exchange for Shredder securing their safe departure from the city. The duo succeeded, but Shredder was livid at the revelation that Steranko was behind the theft of the Kabuto helmet and that Karai escaped when the Turtles interfered. An enraged Shredder proceed to have the duo mutated in Stockman-Fly's lab, Zeck and Steranko respectively exposed to common warthog and white rhinoceros DNA introduced to their two mutagen exposure. After made Foot Clan members against their will, the two are sent after Karai before deciding to go after the Turtles instead out of misplaced revenge. They managed to capture Donatello, Raphael, April O'Neil and Casey Jones before cornering Leonardo and Michelangelo at Coney Island, the latter serving as a distraction while coming up with their mutant names from the van they arrived in. Steranko like "Rocksteady" while Zeck was not fond of initially "Bebop", the two ultimately escaping after briefly fighting the heroes over the retro-mutagen batch Donatello had concocted. They were able to recapture Karai and deliver her to their new master. Rocksteady became the Shredder's connection to the Russian mafia, as mentioned in "Casey Jones Vs. the Underworld".

In "The Noxious Avenger", Bebop and Rocksteady were tasked by Stockman to retrieve a chemical known as "Reagent-X" (and some groceries, to their anger) in order for to create a mind control serum for Shredder to use on Karai, inadvertently finding some mutagen in the process. During their battle with the Turtles however, the mutagen they found wound up being thrown by Zeck all over humble sewer worker-turned-garbage man Garson Grunge, who mutated into Muckman. After witnessing him defeat the Turtles in a later encounter, Bebop and Rocksteady took advantage of the lost and confused Muckman, by convincing him that it was the Turtles' doing for his mutation. Muckman then temporarily helped the duo steal another chemical fighting the Turtles, but eventually came to his senses after noticing Bebop and Rocksteady's true nature when the Turtles rescued him, thus turning on them and destroying the chemical, which caused Bebop and Rocksteady to retreat. In "Meet Mondo Gecko", the two attended Xever's underground mutant race with the rest of the Foot and other mutants who were foes of the Turtles. In "The Deadly Venom," a mind-controlled Karai was able to defeat Rocksteady in combat as part of a test to see if the mind-control serum worked on her.

In "Attack of the Mega Shredder!" the duo are ordered to maintain constant surveillance of the Foot's base, as the Shredder believes the Turtles will soon infiltrate it. Shredder's premonition is proven correct and the two help Tiger Claw and a new trio of Shredder mutants fend off the Turtles. The two capture Leonardo and Michelangelo when they infiltrate the base once again, and prepare to dump them into Stockman's vat of mutagen. However, the two are tricked by Leonardo to create a massive mutant from the Turtles and the three Shredder mutants. Bebop also dumps some sardines into the vat with the Shredder mutants, inadvertently creating a massive Shredder mutant Kaiju that goes on a rampage. After the Turtles defeat the monster, the Shredder is livid at the two, and orders Tiger Claw to deal them a savage beating for their failures.

The duo helped subdue the Turtles to be placed in Karai's traps during "The Fourfold Trap", also suffering a brutal defeat at the hands of Splinter when he came looking for his sons. In "Annihilation: Earth" Pt. 2, when the Triceratons came to Earth with the intention of destroying it, the two helped battle the aliens until Shredder doomed them all by killing Splinter. Terrified, the two embraced each other as they were sucked into the black hole generated by the Triceratons, making them among the first casualties of the destruction of the Earth. However, thanks to Professor Zayton Honeycutt reversing time back six months to before the events of "Annihilation: Earth", the duo were revived, and thanks to the Turtles of the future, the Black Hole Generator is stopped, before being destroyed, along with the Triceraton Mother Ship, by the Fugitoid in a kamikaze attack. Shredder is beaten by Splinter, and the duo are forced to flee Manhattan with the rest of Shredder's crew.

They reappear at the end of "City at War", where taking refuge in a condominium deep in the woods, the duo act as bodyguards for Shredder as he is cared for by Stockman-Fly due to the injuries he sustained leaving him hooked up to medical equipment to keep him alive before Stockman-Fly injects him with mutagen. They soon are teamed up with Tiger Claw in "Broken Foot" to defend the Auman Chemicals factory from Karai as she begins to systematically take down Shredder's criminal empire one piece at a time. After Karai, Shinigami, and Leo are able to damage the factory, but are forced to flee due to being outnumbered by Foot-bots, the duo pursue the Party Wagon, and manage to crash it by removing one of its back tires with their own van's weapons, but the Turtles escape. They regroup with Tiger Claw to defend the factory producing the Foot-bots, but though they manage to capture Karai, Shinigami, and the Foot Ninja with them, the Turtles, minus Donatello, who was injured by the earlier attack's explosives, are able to rescue them and destroy the factory, forcing the duo and Tiger Claw to escape before the NYPD arrived to investigate the destruction.

When their master was fully restored to full strength (and upon receiving a massive dose of special mutagen), they were ordered to seek out the Turtles down in the subway sewers. They eventually succeeded in breaking through the steel door, where the Turtles, April, and Karai were hiding. The pair clashed with the Turtles several more times before the death of the Shredder in the fourth season finale, "Owari". Despite the death of their master, Tiger Claw, the new leader of the Foot, pressed them into service once again. After the demodragon Kavaxas (voiced by Mark Hamill) resurrected the Shredder as a shambling corpse, Bebop and Rocksteady abandoned the Foot Clan for good in "End Times", out of an accurate fear that they were in over their heads.

In the three-part episode saga Crossover Tales, Bebop and Rocksteady are employed by 1987 counterparts of Shredder and Krang to conquer Earth of both 1987 and 2012 realities along with eliminates both realities' Turtles. Despite the frequent mistreatment from Shredder and Krang due to their history with their 1987 counterparts, Bebop and Rocksteady earn their respect before turning upon realizing they intend to destroy the planet and consider becoming super heroes instead. When the 1987 Turtles return to their reality, they tell the 1987 versions of Bebop and Rocksteady that they're allowed to choose their own lives, causing the two to start re-considering their life choices.

When Nickelodeon Rocksteady shows up his merits before he joined the Foot Clan, it shows he fought as a volunteer in Iraq, the Yugoslavian Civil War and the Congo Wars.

Film
 Bebop and Rocksteady were planned to be included in Teenage Mutant Ninja Turtles II: The Secret of the Ooze. Teenage Mutant Ninja Turtles creators Kevin Eastman and Peter Laird objected, partially due to having to go through legal clearances for the characters, resulting in the characters being replaced by two original characters named Tokka and Rahzar.
 Bebop and Rocksteady are mentioned in the song "Shell Shock" by Gym Class Heroes, featuring during the end credits of TMNT.
 Bebop and Rocksteady appear in Turtles Forever, voiced by Braford Cameron and Johnny Castro, respectively. Their human forms are also seen when the Turtles first travel back to the 1987 dimension. In a flashback describing how the Turtles crossed dimensions, they said to their Turtle counterparts that they were facing off against Shredder and the Technodrome, meaning that he got the machine out of Dimension X (as well as Rocksteady and Bebop). Their incompetence is still shown, although it ended up saving the 2003 Shredder when Rocksteady accidentally tripped over and unplugged a laser that was about to destroy him, although Bebop ended up obliterating the 2003 Shredder anyway when he replugged the same laser device all the while thinking he would be pleased that they "fixed" his machine. All this happened just as the Utrom Shredder was unleashing a plan that would wipe out Ninja Turtles of all planes of existence (even if it meant destroying himself since he was still linked to them), so ironically, Bebop saved all of Turtle existence.
 Bebop and Rocksteady were planned to be included in Teenage Mutant Ninja Turtles, but did not make it into the final draft.
 Bebop and Rocksteady appear in Teenage Mutant Ninja Turtles: Out of the Shadows, portrayed by Gary Anthony Williams and Sheamus, respectively. While Bebop's true name is Anton Zeck, the rap sheet in prison guard Casey Jones' hand lists Rocksteady as Owen Rocksteed (though it mentions Ivan Steranko as one of his aliases). Originally, they were two criminals being transported at the same time as the Shredder, after they provide assistance in Shredder's rescue and escape themselves, he selects them as test subjects for a new variation of the mutagen, which taps into dormant animal DNA in their system from a point before life on Earth began to evolve in different routes, causing them to mutate into their more familiar states. While portrayed as more competent than their cartoonish incarnations, Rocksteady and Bebop are powerful fighters but intellectually limited. They constantly goof around, are easily distracted, and at one point Rocksteady becomes completely carried away in the heat of battle and attempts to shoot at the turtles with a Mark 19 grenade launcher mounted on an M1 Abrams tank while they are in a transport plane, resulting in him destroying the cockpit and sending the plane into a crash-dive into a river. There are no scenes in the movie in which Bebop and Rocksteady are seen apart. Casey Jones later fights Bebop and Rocksteady in TCRI's parking garage and tricks them into going into an intermodal container where Casey sets off one of their miniature explosives. Around the end of the movie, it was mentioned in April's news broadcast that Bebop and Rocksteady have been arrested and are in police custody.
 Bebop and Rocksteady will appear in Teenage Mutant Ninja Turtles: Mutant Mayhem, voiced by producer Seth Rogen and John Cena, respectively.

Video games 
 Bebop and Rocksteady appear as bosses in the NES game Teenage Mutant Ninja Turtles.
 Bebop and Rocksteady appear as bosses in the arcade game Teenage Mutant Ninja Turtles. In the game, the Turtles defeat Rocksteady in the first level and Bebop in the second level, and then have a rematch with Rocksteady and Bebop together immediately before rescuing April. Occasionally, Rocksteady and Bebop bump into each other in their attempts to charge the Turtles, but it only resets their stamina to full (but not their overall health).  When the game was released on the NES, the rematch with Rocksteady and Bebop was replaced with a second battle with Baxter Stockman in his mutated insect form.
 Bebop and Rocksteady appear as bosses in Teenage Mutant Ninja Turtles III: The Manhattan Project. In this version, Bebop is armed with a head-mounted ball and chain.
 Bebop and Rocksteady appear as bosses in Teenage Mutant Ninja Turtles: Fall of the Foot Clan.
 Bebop and Rocksteady appear as bosses in Teenage Mutant Ninja Turtles II: Back from the Sewers.
 Bebop and Rocksteady appear as bosses in Teenage Mutant Ninja Turtles: Manhattan Missions.
 Bebop and Rocksteady appear in the Super NES version of Teenage Mutant Ninja Turtles: Turtles in Time. They are dressed as pirates and paired together as a double boss, appearing in the pirate ship level where the Turtles time travel to 1530, replacing the arcade bosses Tokka and Rahzar. (Tokka and Rahzar became minibosses in the newly added Technodrome level instead).
 Rocksteady appears as a boss in Teenage Mutant Ninja Turtles: The Hyperstone Heist. Bebop, however, is nowhere to be seen in this game.
 Bebop and Rocksteady appear in the background of the Mount Olympus arena in the Super NES version of Teenage Mutant Ninja Turtles: Tournament Fighters.
 Bebop and Rocksteady appear as bosses in Teenage Mutant Ninja Turtles, voiced by André Sogliuzzo and Cam Clarke, respectively.
 Bebop and Rocksteady appear as bosses in Teenage Mutant Ninja Turtles: Mutants in Manhattan, voiced by Tim Dadabo and Fred Tatasciore, respectively.
 Bebop and Rocksteady appear as bosses in Teenage Mutant Ninja Turtles: Shredder's Revenge, voiced by Barry Gordon and Cam Clarke, respectively. In this game, Bebop interrupts a broadcast to inform the Turtles that the Foot Clan is taking over the Statue of Liberty. He is defeated in the first level, as is Rocksteady in the second level, then they rematch the Turtles together at the end of the third level.
Bebop is mentioned in Injustice 2 by Leonardo as a random clash quote.

Action figures
Bebop and Rocksteady were among the first 10 action figures released by Playmates Toys in 1988. Rocksteady was packaged with a "Retromutagen Rifle" which was most likely modeled after a US Army M60 general purpose machine gun. Other accessories included a "Turtle Carver Knife" (a bowie knife), a "Manhole Cover Shield", and a removable belt with turtle shell trophies. Bebop was packaged with a "Turtle Shell Drill" (which resembled a power drill but with its own telescopic sight attached), a double-edged knife that resembled the Fairbairn-Sykes fighting knife, and a trashcan lid for a shield. Both retailed originally at $3.98 each.

Bebop and Rocksteady saw continuous release as they were on store shelves for close to a decade from 1988 to 1995. Three years later both Bebop and Rocksteady were reissued as KB Toys exclusives commemorating 10 years of the first toy line. The reissues have the date stamps changed from 1988 to 1998. Both figures were reissued again in 2009 to commemorate the 25th anniversary of Teenage Mutant Ninja Turtles franchise. Other figure incarnations of Bebop and Rocksteady were produced for the Wacky Action, Night Ninjas, Mutant Military 2, Mutation, Smash 'em/Bash 'em, Tournament Fighters, Sewer Heroes, and Warriors of the Forgotten Sewer sub lines and in 13 in. "Giant" scale. In late 2013, figures of Bebop and Rocksteady were released for the Classic Collection toy line.

Weapons
In the 1987 series, Rocksteady and Bebop were armed with various types, makes, and models of firearms and laser weaponry from both Earth and Dimension X. In the early episodes of the 1987 cartoon series, Bebop and Rocksteady were armed with automatic rifles and machine guns, which they used against the Turtles. Later in the series, they were armed with laser rifles and pistols from Dimension X. In "The Cat Woman from Channel Six", Rocksteady carried a wooden sword and Bebop carried a baseball bat.

Besides the extensive array of firepower from both Earth and Dimension X at their disposal, Bebop and Rocksteady were also armed with combat knives; Bebop with a double-edged knife (which resembles the Fairbairn-Sykes Fighting Knife) and Rocksteady with a machete. In some episodes, they are seen fighting over a club.

The use of firearms and laser weaponry by Bebop and Rocksteady help to differentiate them from both the Teenage Mutant Ninja Turtles, Splinter, the Shredder, and the Foot Soldiers/Ninjas who use traditional ninja weaponry. This is because Bebop and Rocksteady were never ninjas, but street punks that were skilled in the use of firearms and knives before they were mutated.

In the game series they use a variety of different weapons. In TMNT: The Arcade Game, Rocksteady used a machine gun while Bebop used a ray gun. In The Manhattan Project, Rocksteady uses a harpoon gun, while Bebop uses a ball and chain mounted on his head. They were absent from the arcade version of Turtles in Time, but in the Super NES version, Rocksteady and Bebop were dressed as a pirate captain and first mate respectively. Rocksteady used a rapier while Bebop used a whip.

In the 2012 series, Anton Zeck/Bebop is equipped with many gadgets, such as gauntlet-mounted lasers, z-ray glasses, a sliding backpack, a tub of glue, a cloaking device run by Double A batteries, a laser Mohawk, and belt-mounted laser-blasters. Ivan Steranko/Rocksteady is equipped with two brass knuckles, a war hammer, a sickle, a laser minigun, a flamethrower, a dart-rifle, and grenades.

References

External links
 Bebop's profile on the official TMNT website
 Rocksteady's profile on the official TMNT website

Animated duos
Villains in animated television series
Black characters in films
Comics characters introduced in 1988
Fictional African-American people
Television characters introduced in 1987
Fictional characters with superhuman strength
Fictional duos
Fictional gang members
Fictional gangsters
Fictional henchmen
Fictional Iraq War veterans
Fictional kidnappers
Fictional mutants
Fictional rhinoceroses
Fictional warthogs
Fictional Yugoslav War veterans
Male characters in animation
Male characters in comics
Teenage Mutant Ninja Turtles characters
Video game bosses
Film supervillains
Male supervillains
fr:Personnages des Tortues Ninja#Bebop et Rocksteady